Killing Eve is a spy thriller television series that premiered on BBC America in the United States on 8 April 2018. The series is based on the Villanelle novel series by Luke Jennings, and follows Eve Polastri (Sandra Oh), a British intelligence investigator tasked with capturing psychopathic assassin Villanelle (Jodie Comer); as the chase progresses, the two develop a mutual obsession.

In January 2020, it was renewed for a fourth and final series, which premiered on 27 February 2022.

Series overview

Episodes

Series 1 (2018)

Series 2 (2019)

Series 3 (2020)

Series 4 (2022)

Ratings

Series 1

Series 2

Series 3

Series 4

Notes

References

External links
 Killing Eve at BBC America
 

Lists of crime drama television series episodes
Lists of comedy-drama television series episodes
Lists of LGBT-related television series episodes
Lists of mystery television series episodes
Killing Eve episodes